Diwan Bahadur Sarukkai Gopalachari (born 16 August 1850), or Gopalacharyar, was an Indian lawyer and administrator who acted as the Diwan of Travancore from 16 August 1906 to 26 October 1907.

Early life 
Gopalachari was born into a Vaishnavite Brahmin family in Sarukkai, Madras Presidency in the year 1850. He graduated in law and worked as a vakil in Madurai before being appointed a sub-judge on 21 March 1885. In June 1903, he was confirmed as officiating district and sessions judge.  Gopalachari was serving as District Judge of Tinnevely when he was appointed Diwan of Travancore in 1906.

Notes 

People from Thanjavur district
Diwans of Travancore
1850 births
Year of death missing